Harold Smith (born January 5, 1962) is a former American football quarterback who played three seasons in the Canadian Football League with the Saskatchewan Roughriders and Edmonton Eskimos. He played college football at Texas Southern University. He was also a member of the New England Steamrollers, Denver Dynamite and Albany Firebirds of the Arena Football League.

References

External links
Just Sports Stats

Living people
1962 births
Players of American football from Houston
Players of Canadian football from Houston
American football quarterbacks
Canadian football quarterbacks
American players of Canadian football
Texas Southern Tigers football players
Saskatchewan Roughriders players
New England Steamrollers players
Edmonton Elks players
Denver Dynamite (arena football) players
Albany Firebirds players